Volodymyr Volodymyrovych Salyuk (born 25 June 2002) is a Ukrainian professional footballer who plays as a centre-back for Chornomorets Odesa.

References

External links
 
 
 

2002 births
Living people
Ukrainian footballers
Association football defenders
FC Balkany Zorya players
FC Chornomorets Odesa players
Ukrainian Premier League players
Ukrainian Second League players